KVTY (105.1 FM) is a radio station broadcasting a hot adult contemporary music format. Licensed to Lewiston, Idaho, United States, the station serves the Lewiston area.  The station is currently owned by Lee and Angela McVey, through licensee McVey Entertainment Group, LLC.

On June 7, 2021, KVTY rebranded as "105.1 The River".

Previous logo

References

External links

VTY
Hot adult contemporary radio stations in the United States